Rowwen Hèze is a band from the small village of America in the province of Limburg, the Netherlands. They are one of the biggest bands singing in North Limburgish, a South Guelderish dialect. The band was founded in 1985.

Music
Rowwen Hèze's music is inspired by many different genres of music, including folk, fanfare and tex-mex. Rowwen Hèze draws a lot of inspiration from the songs of The Pogues, as well as from Los Lobos.

Lyrically the band is influenced by every day items like a hangover, the local Fanfare, fatherhood, walking with the dog or songs about a local figure.

Formation and history
The band started with the search for a new lead singer for the band The Legendary Texas Four. Jack Poels, formerly singing in the band Bad Edge, was willing to fulfill this position, on the condition he was allowed to do one song in dialect. The other band members agreed and Rowwen Hèze was born. In the early years they mostly played covers in English. A lot of bands from Limburg compose a song every Carnaval, which is a big cultural event in that region. Rowwen Hèze became known in all of the Netherlands with the Carnaval song "Niks stront niks" (no crap nothing). After that they gradually sang more and more songs in their local dialect.

Since 1991 the band consists of Jack Poels (vocals, guitar and harmonica), William "Tren" van Enckevort (accordion, piano, trombone and vocals), Jan Philipsen (bass guitar and double bass), Theo Joosten (guitar, mandolin, saxophone, tin whistle and percussion), Jack Haegens (trumpet, flugelhorn, trombone and percussion) and Martîn Rongen (drums and percussion). At the 2013 "Slotconcert" (final concert), Jan Philipsen left the band. Wladimir Geels replaces Jan on bass guitar.

Rowwen Hèze have achieved some success in attracting an audience even among Dutch people who have little knowledge of Limburgish dialects; their lyrics are difficult for anyone who does not understand dialects of Limburgish. They have also proved themselves internationally with a particular mix of Tex-Mex, Irish folk, American rock and brass band music.

Discography
The band has the reputation of being a party band. During their performances, a lot of beer throwing often takes place. Some of their greatest hits are:
 Een kwestie van geduld ('A matter of patience', about how the Limburgish language will gradually take over in the Netherlands)
 Bestel mar ('Just order [Order another round of beer])'
 Auto, Vliegtuug ('Car, Airplane')
 Zondag in 't zuiden ('Sunday in the south' a song about being idle).

Beside making party music, the band is also known for its intimate, reflective songs which are played during their theatre tours.
 De Peel in Brand. ('The Peel on fire', a song in which the singer expresses the desire for the carefree time of his youth, but also the fear he felt as a child for not being able to fathom the forces in the world that can interfere in his own life)
 Werme regen ('Warm rain')
 De Zwarte Plak ('The black spot [Song about war]')
 Blieve loepe ('Keep on walking')
 D'n harde weg ('The hard road' / 'The hard way')
 Vader ('Father, about becoming a father')
 November (Limburgish version of "Raglan Road")

In 2006 the band released their album 'Rodus & Lucius, which directly after its release made number 1 in the Album Top 100 of the Netherlands, proving their national fame.

References

External links
 Official website

Dutch musical groups
Musical groups from Limburg (Netherlands)
Horst aan de Maas